Pawan Diwan is an Indian politician. He was elected to the Lok Sabha as a member of the Indian National Congress.

References

External links
 Official biographical sketch in Parliament of India website

India MPs 1991–1996
India MPs 1996–1997
Lok Sabha members from Madhya Pradesh
Living people
1945 births
People from Chhattisgarh